Q News may refer to:

Q News (Australian magazine), a fortnightly LGBT magazine based in Brisbane, Queensland
Q News (British magazine), a defunct monthly Muslim magazine that was based in London